BitGo, Inc. is a digital asset trust company and security company, headquartered in Palo Alto, California. It was founded in 2013 by Mike Belshe and Ben Davenport. Galaxy Digital announced its acquisition of BitGo in 2021 for $1.2 billion, although this acquisition was announced to have been canceled in 2022 after the crypto downturn, with BitGo continuing as an independent company.

The company offers a multisignature bitcoin wallet service, where keys are divided among a number of owners to manage risk. Generally, BitGo wallets have three keys: one held by BitGo, and two held by the wallet's owner. Wallets can be configured in both hot and cold configurations, as well as non-custodial and custodial configurations.

BitGo also serves as the sole custodian for bitcoin that people deposit to receive a tokenized form of that bitcoin known as Wrapped Bitcoin or WBTC that can be exchanged on the Ethereum blockchain.

History 
In June 2014 the company received US$12 million in venture capital funding led by Redpoint Ventures.

In January 2015 BitGo announced the general availability of their Platform API. The following month the company bought an insurance policy from XL Catlin against theft from its wallets.

On August 2, 2016, Bitfinex, a digital currency exchange using BitGo software,  announced it had suffered a security breach. BitGo was not itself hacked, but processed withdrawal requests from the hacker, who had obtained access to Bitfinex's keys.

In September 2018, BitGo was approved by the South Dakota Division of Banking to act as a qualified custodian for digital assets and created BitGo Trust Company.

In October 2018, the company raised US$15 million in venture capital funding from Goldman Sachs and Mike Novogratz's Galaxy Digital.

In December 2020, the Office of Foreign Assets Control announced that BitGo has paid $98,830 to settle apparent violations of multiple sanctions programs.

In March 2021, BitGo Receives NY Trust Charter from the New York State Department of Financial Services.

In May 2021, Galaxy Digital announced its acquisition of BitGo for $1.2 billion in a cash and stock deal, marking the first $1 billion deal in the cryptocurrency industry. In August 2022, Galaxy's Board of Directors terminated the deal following BitGo's inability to provide certain financial statements needed by Galaxy for its SEC filing. BitGo claimed that it had provided its audited financials and honored its obligations, and that it would take legal action against Galaxy and seek a $100 million termination fee.

In a Delaware Chancery Court complaint dated Sept. 15, 2022, BitGo asserted that while it had filed the required financial reports, Galaxy twice used last-minute criticisms of the accounting methods employed to first delay and then scuttle the acquisition. The suit sought at least $100 million under a termination agreement that was part of the takeover accord between the companies. Galaxy told Forbes that it “completely” disagreed with the allegations.

References

External links
 

Bitcoin companies
American companies established in 2013
Companies based in Palo Alto, California